Virididentula is a monotypic genus of bryozoans belonging to the family Bugulidae. The only species is Virididentula dentata.

The species is found in almost all world oceans.

References

Bryozoan genera